Family Outing (also known as Family Outing Season 1) was a South Korean comedy-variety show; part of SBS's Good Sunday lineup, along with Gold Miss is Coming (골드미스가 간다). It first aired on June 15, 2008, and was one of the top rated programs on Sunday Korean television. Each week, the cast members referred to as "Family" travelled to different locations in South Korea to stay for a single night. During their stay the Family would play games and complete tasks set by the owners of the home, while the owners are out on vacation.

The game-variety show format of Family Outing has widely been considered to be influenced by its predecessor, X-Man with both programs sharing key production and cast members, the most notable of which being Main Producer Jang Hyuk-jae, MC Yoo Jae-suk and cast member Kim Jong-kook. Trademarks of the production included sound effects, pop-up text and background music in accordance with the on-screen narrative. Music included personal theme songs for various cast members, frequently coordinated with moments of lament or foolishness for comedic effect, or schadenfreude.

The first season ended on February 14, 2010, and a 17 episode second season featuring a brand new cast and production team aired from 21 February 2010 to July 11, 2010.

Episode synopsis 
The show typically followed a format comprising a series of two-episode arcs.  These comprised a two-day shoot, including an overnight stay for the cast and crew, that was edited for broadcast over two weekly episodes.  Generally, the events transpiring on the first day of filming would be shown in the first of the two-episode arc, with the second day's events broadcast in the second episode.  These two days of filming were generally filmed biweekly, with the cast and crew regathering every two weeks.  Guest cast members frequently joined the permanent members for the two-episode arc, appearing in two successive episodes before departing.

The first of two episodes typically starts with a phone call from Yoo Jae-suk, the MC of the show, notifying the Family members where and when to gather for the next location of filming, which was frequently a remote, rural region. Each member arrives along with any guests, as they greet each other and the viewing audience. The guest is usually then given a map to lead the Family to the house in which they will be staying for their two-day stay. Upon reaching the house, the Family greet and send the homeowners off on a vacation.  At this point, the Family reviews the list of chores that the homeowners have assigned before setting upon the first task. While completing the list of chores, the Family compete in various mental and physical challenges. After completing the first chore, the Family may proceed to the next assigned or return home to prepare dinner.  For the latter, the Family usually divides into teams to gather ingredients, clean, prepare, and cook.

After eating dinner, the Family typically play another game before preparing for bedtime.  This game often determines sleep positions or who is in charge of late-night/early-morning chores.  Sleeping arrangement allowed the Family to determine where each member would be positioned overnight, with this ranking of particular importance if sleeping locations included particularly undesirable quarters, such as a cold and cramped room, or next to someone inclined to flatulence.  The ranking process involved the female cast members numerically ranking the men in the Family, often based on their performance either in the preceding game or over the course of the day.  The male members then repeat the ranking process for the female Family members. In addition to bedding location, the ranking system or game was used to determine which Family members would be assigned the undesirable task of late-night/early-morning chores.  These chores were typically menial tasks such as delivery, collection, or preparation of food.

The second of two episodes typically begins with the continuation of the previous night's activities. Frequently this involved some late-night conversation before the Family dozed off. The next morning, Yoo Jae-suk is typically the first to be woken and is then himself assigned the task of waking the other Family members.  The reluctant waking process is usually presented for comedic effect.  After the Family rise, Jae-suk initiates a "Wake Up Mission", where the losing member would be tasked with breakfast preparation, alongside other members (s)he selects. While they make breakfast, the rest of the Family either returns to bed, or completes another chore.  The Family members that are assigned breakfast duty are frequently filmed gathering ingredients from around the community before commencing preparation and cooking.  In this way the program also highlights regional produce and places of interest in more rural villages.  After the Family awakens a second time to eat breakfast, they typically perform the last chores assigned by the homeowners. While completing these final tasks, the Family will often participate in another competition before returning to the house.
The homeowners are then shown returning from vacation and bidding the Family farewell.  The episode concludes with a sneak peek of the following episode, including the next guest(s).

Cast and characters 
The first "Family" was composed of comedian/MC Yoo Jae-suk, singer/songwriter/MC Yoon Jong-shin, Big Bang member Daesung, singer Lee Hyo-ri, actor Kim Su-ro, singer Kim Jong-kook, actor Park Hae-jin, actress Park Si-yeon, actress Park Ye-jin and actor Lee Chun-hee. "Family" members Park Ye-jin and Lee Chun-hee left the show after 53 episodes and the expiration of their one-year contract with both citing their desire to focus on their acting careers. Near the end of the series, Park Si-yeon could not continue filming the show because of a physical injury.

On November 26, 2009, it was announced that Yoo Jae-suk and Park Si-yeon would be leaving the show.  It was later reported that Family Outing Season 1 would end due to the conflicting schedules and solo activities of the members. Their last episode aired in February 2010 with the show returning for a second season, with a new concept, production team, and cast.  All the original Family members reunited for the last three episodes, which included a special reunion awards episode.

Yoo Jae-suk, June 2008 / February 2010
Lee Hyo-ri, June 2008 / February 2010
Yoon Jong-shin, June 2008 / February 2010
Kim Su-ro, June 2008 / February 2010
Kang Dae-sung, June 2008 / February 2010
Kim Jong-kook, November 2008 / February 2010
Park Hae-jin, July 2009 / February 2010
Lee Chun-hee, June 2008 / June 2009
Park Ye-jin, June 2008 / June 2009
Park Si-yeon, July 2009 / December 2009

Guest stars 

Guest star(s) were featured in most episodes, with the majority being in two back-to-back episodes.

Guests who were featured in more than two episodes are Jang Hyuk who appeared in episodes 27, 28 and 29 during the Christmas Special and Seo In-young (Jewelry) and Park Jin-young, whom both appeared in episodes 76, 77 and 78.

Family Outing had featured a variety of South Korea's most popular figures including actors (Cha Tae-hyun, Cha Seung-won, Ha Ji-won), athletes (Chu Sung-hoon), comedians (Ji Sang-ryeol) and kpop idols (Yoona, Taeyeon)

Ratings 
In the ratings below, the highest rating for the show will in be red, and the lowest rating for the show will be in blue.

2008

2009

2010

Awards and nominations

See also
SBS Family Outing 2
SBS Good Sunday
KBS 1 Night 2 Days
MBC Infinite Challenge

Notes

References

External links
Family Outing on the Official Good Sunday page 

Seoul Broadcasting System original programming
South Korean travel television series
South Korean reality television series
South Korean variety television shows
2008 South Korean television series debuts
2010 South Korean television series endings
2010s South Korean television series
Korean-language television shows